Mark Williams is the self-titled debut studio album by New Zealand-born singer Mark Williams. It was released in June 1975 a year after being signed to EMI Music by Alan Galbraith. The album peaked at number 2 on the Official New Zealand Music Chart, remaining on the charts for 30 weeks. It was the highest selling album by a New Zealand artist in New Zealand in 1975.

Reception
Suedo Nim from Victoria University of Wellington said "Mark Williams' debut album.. deserved its kudos. The brilliant combination of pop-soul, the sheer panache of tracks like "Love the One You're With" and "Ain't No Sunshine" made it a classy production."

Track listing
LP/Cassette (HSD 1040)

Charts

Weekly charts

Year-end charts

References

1975 debut albums
EMI Records albums
Mark Williams (singer) albums